, also known as Rust-Eater Bisco, is a Japanese light novel series written by Shinji Cobkubo and illustrated by K Akagishi, with world-building art by mocha. ASCII Media Works have released eight volumes since March 2018 under their Dengeki Bunko label. The light novel is licensed in North America by Yen Press. A manga adaptation with art by Rokudo 
Takahashi was serialized online between April 2019 and March 2021 via Square Enix's online manga magazine Manga UP!. It was collected in four tankōbon volumes. The second part of the manga with art by Sō Natsuki was serialized in the same magazine between December 2021 and October 2022 and has been collected in two tankōbon volumes. An anime television series adaptation by OZ aired from January to March 2022.

Plot
Set in post-apocalyptic Japan, the land is ravaged by rust, a deadly plague-like wind which affects everything it touches, including humans. It is believed to originate from mushroom spores and so Bisco Akaboshi, a Mushroom Keeper and archer whose arrows instantly grow mushrooms wherever they land, is a wanted criminal. He and his giant crab Akutagawa team up with the young doctor Milo Nekoyanagi to search the wastelands for the legendary "Sabikui", a mushroom said to devour all forms of rust.

Characters

A 17-years old Mushroom Keeper with the nickname of "Man-Eating Mushroom" who is regarded as a terrorist and has a price on his head. He commands the giant crab , which he regards as his brother, that is also used for transport. His primary weapon, common to all Mushroom Keepers, is a bow with arrows coated in special spores that causes a variety of giant mushrooms to instantly grow wherever the arrowheads pierce.

A young doctor with outstanding medical skills who runs the Panda Clinic. He has pale blue hair and is nicknamed "Panda" because of his pale skin and the dark spot over his left eye socket. To compensate for his amateur archery skills and lower physical prowess compared to Bisco, Milo modifies his arrows with various explosives and chemical agents.

Milo Nekoyanagi's older sister who is stricken with the Rust disease. She is Captain of the Imihama Watch, which defends society from "mushroom terrorists". Her weapon of choice is a heavy metal rod and, despite the advanced state of her affliction, she possesses incredible strength and agility.

An old Mushroom Keeper who is Bisco's mentor and father figure. He is stricken by a severe case of Rust disease, which has given him a month at best to live.

Chief of the Vigilantism and later Governor of Imihama Prefecture. He rules the region with a mafia-like iron fist, employing bunny-masked enforcers to carry out his will. His weapon of choice is a revolver that fires rusty bullets that infect targets with the Rust disease.

A young female mercenary with long plaited pink hair which prompts Bisco to nickname her "Jellyfish". She used to work as a mechanic on a Tetsujin project years ago, but fled when all of her co-workers succumbed to the Rust disease. She was initially employed by Kurokawa, but also has a side-job as a traveling merchant, selling various odds and ends such as weapon blueprints and snacks.

Media

Light novels

Manga
A manga adaptation with art by Yūsuke Takahashi was serialized online between April 10, 2019 and March 2, 2021 via Square Enix's online manga magazine Manga UP!. It was collected in four tankōbon volumes. The second part of the manga with art by Sō Natsuki was serialized in the same magazine between December 15, 2021 and October 28, 2022, and has been collected in three tankōbon volumes. The first part is licensed digitally in North America by Comikey.

First part

Second part

Anime
During the "Kadokawa Light Novel Expo 2020" event on March 6, 2021, it was announced that the series will be receiving an anime television series adaptation by OZ. Atsushi Itagaki is directing the series, with Sadayuki Murai writing the series' scripts, Ai Asari and Ikariya designing the characters, and Takeshi Ueda and Hinako Tsubakiyama composing the series' music. It aired from January 11 to March 29, 2022, on Tokyo MX and other channels. The opening theme song is "Kaze no Oto Sae Kikoenai" (Even the Wind is Silent) by JUNNA, while the ending theme song is "Hōkō" (Howl) by Ryōta Suzuki and Natsuki Hanae as their respective characters. Crunchyroll licensed the series outside of Asia, and streamed it on both Funimation and Crunchyroll. Muse Communication licensed the series in South and Southeast Asia; available to watch on iQiyi and also Muse Asia YouTube Channel. This series aired on Animax across Southeast Asia starting May 17, 2022.

The anime was released on DVD and Blu-ray in Japan across 3 volumes, each volume containing 4 episodes. The first volume was released on March 23, 2022 and the last volume was released on May 25, 2022. Crunchyroll released the series on Blu-ray in North America on January 3, 2023.

Episode list

Reception
In 2019, the light novel ranked first in the overall ranking and in the new work ranking in Takarajimasha's annual light novel guide book Kono Light Novel ga Sugoi!, in the bunkobon category, becoming the first series to do this. As of October 2021 the series has over 300,000 copies in circulation.

See also
Campfire Cooking in Another World with My Absurd Skill - A light novel series whose manga adaptation is also illustrated by K Akagishi

Notes

References

External links
  
  
 

2018 Japanese novels
2022 anime television series debuts
Adventure anime and manga
Anime and manga based on light novels
Crunchyroll anime
Dengeki Bunko
Gangan Comics manga
Japanese webcomics
Kadokawa Dwango franchises
Light novels
Muse Communication
Post-apocalyptic anime and manga
Post-apocalyptic novels
Shōnen manga
Webcomics in print
Yen Press titles